The 2021 FIBA Women's EuroBasket final was played at the Pavelló Municipal Font de Sant Lluís in Valencia, Spain, on 27 June 2021. Serbia won their second title winning 63–54 in the final.

Road to the final

Match details

References

External links
Official website

final
2021
Sports competitions in Valencia
2020–21 in Serbian basketball
2020–21 in French basketball